Tatyana Sherstyuk (born August 10, 1981) is a Russian artist and curator based in Moscow.

Life and work 
Tatyana was born on August 10, 1981. At 2003 she got MFA degree with diploma of artist by Moscow State Textile University at the faculty of Applied Arts. In 2004 she was accepted to the school of postgraduate education at Parsons School of Design at New York City, United States. At 2006 she was released from Institute of Television and Radio Ostankino. At 2009 she got a major in contemporary art from Institute of Contemporary Art Moscow.

Tatyana creates conceptual installations. Her art was influenced by collaboration with representatives of direction Moscow Conceptualism. She participates in Russian and International exhibitions from 2001, including Dakar Biennale, Moscow Biennale, Moscow International Biennale for Young Art. Among her art projects, there are independent as well as collaborative projects with Anton Nikolaev, Denis Mustafin, Alexey Sysoev, Victor Skersis, Nedda Al-Madani, Ksenia Podoynitsina. Her art works belong to personal and museum collections. At 2016 Tatyana played a main woman's character at drama movie Raison D'Etre. At 2017 and 2018 she has been included to the list of acknowledged artists of Russia Inart. Starting from 2018, she gives author's lections about contemporary art. In 2019 she won a VI Session of program of "Factory studios" (Center of Creative Industries "FABRIKA") a category "Exhibition at Fabrika".

Solo exhibitions

2013 
 "Leftovers" – solo exhibition at Center of Creative Industries "FABRIKA", Moscow

2017 

"Hic Sunt Dracones" (Latin "Here Live Dragons") – solo exhibition consisted from a total audio-visual installation at Center of Creative Industries "FABRIKA", Moscow. Music for the installation was written by a contemporary music composer Alexey Sysoev at 2017.

2018 
"Owls are not what they seem" joint exhibition together with Victor Skersis, Gallery 21, Moscow Contemporary Art Center Winzavod, Moscow

2019 

"72 spins around a significant other", Center of Creative Industries "FABRIKA", Moscow

2020 
“A way of transformations. How I became a shadow of a cat”, practices of shshsh at special project of VII Moscow International Biennale for Young Art

Group exhibitions

2001 
 "The Number", Moscow Museum of Unesco, Moscow
 "The Number", Central House of Artist, Moscow
 "The Number", "Agit Plakat" Gallery, Moscow
 "The Number", "100 Years of Russian Poster", Tretyakov Gallery, Moscow.

2004 
 "Mokosh", Tretyakov Gallery, Moscow

2009 
 Happy Today", Central House of Artist, Moscow
 "Happy Today", 3d Moscow Biennale, Red October, Moscow

2010 
 "Autonomy" – alternative festival of young contemporary art festival "Stop! Where are you going?", Moscow
 Exactly that", Zverev Center, Moscow
 Oh really!!!", Eastern Gallery, Moscow
 Personal", "Objective" KEC, Moscow
 "Oh really!!!", project " Freedom", Moscow

2011 
 "Forest for forest", 4 Moscow Biennale, Moscow.
 "cat in a box", "Cat's party", ArtPlay Gallery, Moscow.
 "Media fishtank", "55/33" ArtPlay Gallery, Moscow.
 "Dresses for walls", "From the opposite"Moscow Contemporary Art Center Winzavod.
 "Express", project "No art" Gallery, Moscow Contemporary Art Center Winzavod.

2012 
 "SothBus" Charity Auction, Design factory "Flacon", Moscow.
 "We are Skiffs", Zverev Center, Moscow.

2013 
 "New Year greetings of president", Shchusev Museum of Architecture, special project of Moscow Biennale, Moscow

2015 
 "Dresses for walls", "Playing human", Ground Gallery, Moscow.
 Q1=Q2, Young International Biennale of Contemporary Art, Guslitsa art residence, Guslitsa.
 "Leftovers", Imagio Mundi, Dakar Biennale

2017 
 "Institute of very contemporary art – in fact – Bakstein", Moscow Museum of Modern Art, Moscow.
 "Dresses for walls", "Playtime", Gallery 21, Moscow Contemporary Art Center Winzavod
 "Deconstruction", InArt, Moscow
 "New Year greetings of president" made in collaboration with Anton Nikolaev, "Men's work", Museum of Contemporary Art, Ekaterinburg

2019 
 "Dachnoe Tsaritsyno", group exhibition at Tsaritsyno Museum, Moscow
 "Another Atmosphere", group exhibition, Bakulev Scientific Center of Cardiovascular Surgery, Moscow
 "Bakstein Collection", Vladey Gallery, Moscow Contemporary Art Center Winzavod, Moscow

Curator's projects

2010 
 "autopsya", alternative festival of young contemporary art festival "Stop! Where are you going?", Moscow
 "Plener", Zverev Center, Moscow

2013 
 "Uchronia" – in collaboration with Nedda Al-Madani, Shchusev Museum of Architecture, special project of 5th Moscow Biennale

2014 
 "Art Marathon" in collaboration with Gallery 21, Contemporary Art Center Sokol, Moscow.
 "Touch and Tap TV" Boryana Rossa performance, Moscow State Solyanka Gallery, Moscow.

2016 
 "Reflection" made in collaboration with Ksenia Podoynitsyna, Museum of Moscow

Author's lectures and master classes

2013 
 "Art in advertising", Red Apple Advertising Festival

2018 
 "Integration of Art and Architecture", Peresvetov Lane Gallery
 "How to hunt for contemporary art with bare hands", Moscow Institute of Physics and Technology

2019 
 "Color and shadow" master class made for a charity project "Another Atmosphere", Bakulev Scientific Center of Cardiovascular Surgery, Moscow
 "Alive blots" master class made for "Dachnoe Tsaritsyno" Festival, at Tsaritsyno Museum, Moscow

References

External links 
 
 Advertising stencil art
 Interview with cultural critic Ekaterina Etush (exhibition " Leftovers")

1981 births
Living people
Russian women artists
Russian contemporary artists